2010 State Basketball League season may refer to:

2010 MSBL season, Men's SBL season
2010 WSBL season, Women's SBL season